Piraeus is the name of two railway stations in Piraeus, Greece, approximately 9 km south-west of the centre of Athens. The southern building is an interchange station between Line 1 and Line 3 and is the present terminus of Athens Metro Line 1, formerly the Athens-Piraeus Railways Co that opened in 1869. Both buildings are located next to the seaport, with the Electric Railways Museum of Piraeus located in the station, in the space of the former Post Office.

History

Piraeus metro station
The Piraeus metro station opened in 1869 by Sap company to connect Piraeus and Athens (at the time Piraeus was not yet integral part of Athens agglomeration) as conventional steam single-track mixed cargo and passenger railway line and electrified in 1904 however, the line had open between Thissio and Piraeus (with the first terminal in Neo Faliro) in 1869, becoming the first railway line in Greece. The Line 3 extension opened on 10 October 2022.

Piraeus railway station
The Station opened on then Ploutonos Street, today's Kallimassioti coast on 30 June 1884 on what was the Piraeus, Athens and Peloponnese line (or SPAP) build to connect In 1920 Hellenic State Railways or SEK was established, however, many railways, such as the SPAP continued to be run as a separate company, becoming an independent company once more two years later.

Due to growing debts, the SPAP came under government control between 1939 and 1940. During the Axis occupation of Greece (1941–44), Athens was controlled by German military forces, and the line was used for the transport of troops and weapons. During the occupation (and especially during the German withdrawal in 1944), the network was severely damaged by both the German army and Greek resistance groups. The track and rolling stock replacement took time following the civil war, with normal service levels resumed around 1948. In 1954 SPAP was nationalized once more. In 1962 the SPAP was amalgamated into SEK. In 1970, OSE became the legal successor to the SEK, taking over responsibilities for most of Greece's rail infrastructure. On 1 January 1971 the station and most of the Greek rail infrastructure were transferred to the Hellenic Railways Organisation S.A., a state-owned corporation. Freight traffic declined sharply when the state-imposed monopoly of OSE for the transport of agricultural products and fertilisers ended in the early 1990s. Many small stations of the network with little passenger traffic were closed down.

In 2001 the infrastructure element of OSE was created, known as GAIAOSE; it would henceforth be responsible for the maintenance of stations, bridges and other elements of the network, as well as the leasing and the sale of railway assists. In 2003, OSE launched "Proastiakos SA", as a subsidiary to serve the operation of the suburban network in the urban complex of Athens during the 2004 Olympic Games. In 2005, TrainOSE was created as a brand within OSE to concentrate on rail services and passenger interface. That same year the station closed, with the last service 7 August 2005, together with the section Piraeus-Agioi Anargyroi of the railway line Athens "Peloponnese Central station-Corinth. After reconstruction, it was reopened as a station of the Athens Suburban Railway on 3 June 2007. Until 2005 it served the rail transport between Piraeus and Piraeus. this was also known informally as the Peloponnese Station. From Piraeus station, a line led to the port of Piraeus, through which freight trains were circulating that performed transhipments between the railway and the ships.

In 2008, the Athens Suburban Railway was transferred to TrainOSE. In 2009, with the Greek debt crisis unfolding OSE's Management was forced to reduce services across the network. Timetables were cutback and routes closed, as the government-run entity attempted to reduce overheads. In 2014 work began to update and expand the station. In 2017 OSE's passenger transport sector was privatised as TrainOSE, currently a wholly-owned subsidiary of Ferrovie dello Stato Italiane infrastructure, including stations, remained under the control of state-owned OSE. In July 2022, the station began being served by Hellenic Train, the rebranded TrainOSE.

Services

Since 15 May 2022, the following weekday services call at the railway station:

 Athens Suburban Railway Line 1 towards , with up to one train per hour;
 Athens Suburban Railway Line 2 towards , with up to one train per hour.

Station layout

Gallery

See also
Railway stations in Greece
Hellenic Railways Organization
Athens-Piraeus Electric Railways
Hellenic Train
Proastiakos
P.A.Th.E./P.
Piraeus
Athens railway station

References

External links

Piraeus metro line 3 station construction videos

Athens Metro stations
Railway stations opened in 1869
Buildings and structures in Piraeus
Railway stations in Attica
1869 establishments in Greece
Piraeus, Athens and Peloponnese Railways